Egau is a river of Baden-Württemberg and Bavaria, Germany. It flows into the Danube near Höchstädt an der Donau.

See also
List of rivers of Baden-Württemberg

References

Rivers of Baden-Württemberg
Rivers of Bavaria
Rivers of Germany